Mansur Faqiryar (born 3 January 1986) is an Afghan former footballer who played as a goalkeeper. He played in Germany and represented the Afghanistan national team at international level.

Club career
In 2005, Faqiryar signed for amateur club FC Union 60 Bremen. He played there for one season before moving to FC Oberneuland in 2006. Whilst at the club he managed 44 appearances in the league as well as two appearances in the DFB-Pokal.

In 2009, he signed with Niedersachsenliga club VfB Oldenburg.

International career
In 2011, Faqiryar made his debut for the Afghanistan national team, in a 3–0 win over Bhutan. In 2011, he collected five caps overall. He was voted Best Player of the Tournament in the SAFF 2013 for his great goalkeeping efforts.

Career statistics

Honours
Afghanistan
 SAFF Championship: 2013

Individual
 SAFF Championship Best Goalkeeper Award: 2013

References

External links
nwz.de
radiobremen.de
ostfriesenzeitung.de

1986 births
Living people
Afghan emigrants to Germany
Afghan footballers
Footballers from Kabul
Association football goalkeepers
Afghanistan international footballers
Footballers at the 2014 Asian Games
Asian Games competitors for Afghanistan
Regionalliga players
FC Oberneuland players
Goslarer SC 08 players
VfB Oldenburg players